Male submission or malesub is a situation in BDSM and other sexual activities in which the submissive partner is male. A woman who dominates a male submissive is referred to as a dominant, domme (feminine form of "dominant") or dominatrix. Sexual activity between a male submissive and a dominatrix is referred to as femdom. A 2015 study indicates that 46.6% of men who are active in BDSM expressed a preference for a submissive role, 24% consider themselves to be switches and 29.5% prefer the dominant role.

Types of submission 
Male submission in BDSM can take many different forms and include a variety of activities, including cock and ball torture, forced feminization, chastity, cuckoldry, erotic humiliation, facesitting, golden showers, pegging, foot fetishism, and clothed female, naked male.

History 
During the 18th century, some European brothels began specializing in restraint, and flagellation, as well as other activities which involved female domination and male submission.

See also 
 Chastity belt (BDSM)
 Cock and ball torture
 Dominance and submission
 Female submission
 Male dominance (BDSM)
 Pegging (sexual practice)

References 

BDSM terminology
Men